Bohemia Township, Nebraska may refer to the following places in Nebraska:

Bohemia Township, Knox County, Nebraska
Bohemia Township, Saunders County, Nebraska

See also
Bohemia Township (disambiguation)

Nebraska township disambiguation pages